Ihsanul Karim (born 5 January 1951) is a Bangladeshi journalist. He is the press secretary to the Prime Minister of Bangladesh. Prior to his appointment at the Prime Minister's Office, Karim worked as the Press Secretary to the President. He also served as the Managing Director and Chief Editor of Bangladesh Sangbad Sangstha (BSS), state-run national news agency of Bangladesh.

Early life
Karim was born on 5 January 1951. He obtained his master's degree in economics from Dhaka University. He participated in the Bangladesh Liberation War in 1971 under the command of Mujib Bahini.

References

Bangladeshi journalists
Living people
1951 births
University of Dhaka alumni